Man of Iron, foaled in Kentucky in 2006, is an American Thoroughbred racehorse. Sired by Giant's Causeway and out of the mare Better Than Honour, he was bred by Skara Glen Stables. He was sold as a yearling to Racing Partners Smith/Magnier/Tabor, who turned over his training to Aidan O'Brien.

On November 6, 2009, he won the most important race of his career: the Breeders' Cup Marathon. In the 14-furlong race, he fought off Cloudy's Knight to win by a nose.

Siblings

Teeming - 2001 bay filly by Storm Cat

Magnificent Honour - 2002 bay filly by A.P. Indy

Jazil - 2003 bay colt by Seeking the Gold

Rags to Riches - 2004 chestnut filly by A.P. Indy

Casino Drive - 2005 chestnut colt by A.P. Indy

Notes

External links
 Man of Iron pedigree and racing stats

2006 racehorse births
Racehorses bred in Kentucky
Racehorses trained in the United States
Breeders' Cup Marathon winners
Thoroughbred family 8-f